The acronym MATA may refer to:
 Memphis Area Transit Authority
 McKinney Avenue Transit Authority
 Macedonian Translators Association
 MATA Festival, a New York-based annual contemporary classical music festival